John Minton may refer to:

 John D. Minton Jr. (born 1952), Kentucky Supreme Court judge
 John Minton (artist) (1917–1957), artist and illustrator
 Big John Studd (1948–1995), wrestler